Carl Gentile is a former U.S. soccer forward.  He played one season in the National Professional Soccer League and two in the North American Soccer League, all three with the St. Louis Stars.  He also earned six caps with the U.S. national team in 1968.

Youth
Gentile grew up in St. Louis, Missouri where he graduated from Christian Brothers College High School in 1962.  He is a member of the CBC Alumni Hall of Fame.  Gentile went on to play for St. Louis University, gaining first team All-American recognition in 1965.  That year St. Louis also won the NCAA championship.  In 2009, Gentile was named to the St. Louis University Men's Soccer Half-Century Team.

Professional
In 1967, Gentile signed with the St. Louis Stars of the National Professional Soccer League (NPSL).  When the NPSL merged with the United Soccer Association in 1968 to form the North American Soccer League (NASL), the Stars moved to the NASL.  Gentile played the 1968 NASL season, then left the team.  He returned for the 1971 NASL season.

Olympic and national teams
In 1964, Gentile joined the U.S. Olympic team as it attempted, but ultimately failed, to qualify for the 1964 Summer Olympics.   The U.S. lost its first match of qualifying on March 16 when Surinam defeated the U.S. 1-0.  Gentile scored three goals two days later in a 4-2 win over Panama.  He scored again two days later in a 2-1 loss to Mexico which put the U.S. out of contention for the tournament.

Gentile earned his first cap with the U.S. national team on September 15, 1968.  A month later he earned his second cap, this time as a defender in a 6-3 victory over Haiti.  He then played three 1970 FIFA World Cup qualification matches, all three wins, the first over Canada and the next two over Bermuda.

Other sports
Gentile played professional baseball in the St. Louis Cardinals farm system and attempted to become a professional American football kicker, trying out for the Houston Oilers in 1970.

Coaching
Gentile now coaches with the St. Louis Soccer Club, now known as Saint Louis Scott Gallagher.

He was inducted into the St. Louis Soccer Hall of Fame on October 20, 1995.

References

External links
 NASL stats

Living people
1947 births
American soccer players
National Professional Soccer League (1967) players
North American Soccer League (1968–1984) players
Soccer players from St. Louis
St. Louis Stars (soccer) players
Saint Louis Billikens men's soccer players
United States men's international soccer players
American people of Italian descent
Baseball players from Missouri
Association football forwards
NCAA Division I Men's Soccer Tournament Most Outstanding Player winners